Marcelo de Souza dos Santos Júnior (born 17 January 1998), commonly known as Marcelo or Juninho, is a Brazilian footballer who currently plays as a midfielder for Paraná, on loan from Cruzeiro.

Career statistics

Club

Notes

References

1998 births
Living people
Brazilian footballers
Association football forwards
Cruzeiro Esporte Clube players
Associação Atlética Ponte Preta players
Ipatinga Futebol Clube players
Esporte Clube Vitória players
Campeonato Brasileiro Série A players
People from Ribeirão Preto
Footballers from São Paulo (state)